11/10 may refer to:
November 10 (month-day date notation)
October 11 (day-month date notation)
11 shillings and 10 pence in UK predecimal currency